The women's 800 metre freestyle competition of the swimming events at the 1987 Pan American Games took place on 14 August at the Indiana University Natatorium. The last Pan American Games champion was Tiffany Cohen of US.

This race consisted of sixteen lengths of the pool, all in freestyle.

Results
All times are in minutes and seconds.

Heats

Final 
The final was held on August 14.

References

Swimming at the 1987 Pan American Games
Pan